Upper Dublin School District is located in Upper Dublin Township, Montgomery County, in the Commonwealth of Pennsylvania.

Overview

The school district operates four elementary schools, one middle school, and one high school, and serves students in grades K-12. The professional staff has an average of 16 years teaching experience and approximately 85% hold advanced degrees. The Upper Dublin School District is a separate governmental body from Upper Dublin Township, and is guided by the statutes of the Commonwealth of Pennsylvania. It has a Board of Directors elected by the residents with the power to levy taxes within state guidelines. A superintendent is in charge of day-to-day operations as well as strategic planning. The District offices are located at 1580 Fort Washington Avenue, Maple Glen, PA 19002.

Class sizes of in major subject areas across the district are between 22 and 32 students. Facilities available to the district include a planetarium, technology labs, modern computerized libraries, and Robbins Park, a 38-acre nature preserve for environmental studies. The district also has subject area coordinators and supervisors, and Special Education programs running in all buildings.

Accreditation and recognition
The four elementary schools: Fort Washington Elementary School, Maple Glen Elementary School, Jarrettown Elementary School, and Thomas Fitzwater Elementary School(K-5), the middle school Sandy Run Middle School(6-8), and the high school Upper Dublin High School(9-12) are all accredited by the Middle States Association of Colleges and Schools. Upper Dublin High School became a Blue Ribbon School of Excellence in 1996, recognized by the United States Department of Education.

Upper Dublin School District was the first school district in Pennsylvania to receive a K-12 paradigmatic accreditation from the Middle States Association of Colleges and Schools. Approximately 400 staff, community members, students, parents, and township officials were involved in the process.

Parent-teacher groups
Parent volunteer groups are active in all six Upper Dublin schools. Parent-teacher groups sponsor special assembly programs, Child Watch programs, the Safe Home program (at the High School), school dances and fairs, after-school enrichment classes, and other activities and events. The Parent-Teacher Council is the umbrella organization for the parent-teacher groups. Parents are encouraged to join these organizations.

Schools

Fort Washington Elementary School
Fort Washington Elementary School (FWES) is located in Fort Washington, PA. It serves students in Grades K-5.
Shawn McAleer, Principal

Maple Glen Elementary School
Maple Glen Elementary School is located in Maple Glen, PA. It serves students in Grade K-5. It is the newest elementary school in the district; the school opened in September 2000. The school, which has been the home to roughly 450 students each year since its inception, was designed to be easily expanded to accommodate an ultimate enrollment of 600 students. The school is designed with a shingled roof and landscaping.

The interior of the school houses a full-size gymnasium, library, cafetorium, computer laboratory, and a networked technology infrastructure that is expandable and upgradeable. Each of the twenty five classrooms feature floor-to-ceiling bay windows, which provide views of the outdoors. Additional features include an art suite, equipped with a visual, wet and kiln room, band and vocal music rooms, a PTO room, health suite, guidance suite, and an expandable large group room. Smaller-sized seminar rooms are utilized by the speech and language pathologist, reading specialist, and school psychologist. All rooms, classrooms included, are equipped with a telephone, making communication convenient while adding another safety feature.

Several exterior courtyards serve as outdoor classrooms, and the school has two developmental playgrounds designed specifically for younger and older children, including disabled children.
Robert Corcoran, Principal

Thomas Fitzwater Elementary School
Thomas Fitzwater Elementary School (TFES) is located in Willow Grove, PA, it opened in 1962 and serves students in Grade K-5. Its mascot is a cheetah named Speedy. A statue named "The Swimmer II" previously stood in front of the building, but has been taken down by staff for remodeling.
Hannah Kim, Principal

Jarrettown Elementary School
Jarrettown Elementary School is located in Dresher, PA. It serves students in Grade K-5.
Jason Hamer, Principal

Sandy Run Middle School
Sandy Run Middle School serves students Grades 6–8. It is located in southwest Upper Dublin Township. The building contains a planetarium, full size gym, cafeteria, auditorium, and library.

There were two buildings, each being connected by the "breezeway". The Annex, which has since been taken down for remodeling, had four "towers" (ABCD), which housed classrooms and the World Languages department. The building also featured a small gym, technology lab, and band rooms.
Daniel Ortiz, Principal

Upper Dublin High School

 Robert Schultz, Principal

References

External links
Upper Dublin School District
Upper Dublin Adult Evening School, Community and Aquatics Programs
Upper Dublin Planetarium
Fort Washington Elementary School
Jarrettown Elementary School
Maple Glen Elementary School
Thomas Fitzwater Elementary School
Sandy Run Middle School
Upper Dublin High School

School districts in Montgomery County, Pennsylvania
Upper Dublin Township, Montgomery County, Pennsylvania